Olesa may refer to:

Olesa de Bonesvalls, town in the comarca of Alt Penedès
Olesa de Montserrat, municipality in the comarca of Baix Llobregat